During the 2000 Paralympics, one female athlete and one male athlete represented Uruguay at the 2000 Summer Paralympics in Sydney. Uruguay did not win any medals during the 2000 Paralympics.

See also
2000 Summer Paralympics

References

Bibliography

External links
International Paralympic Committee

Nations at the 2000 Summer Paralympics
Paralympics
2000